Pieter-Jan Postma (born the 10th of January 1982 in Heerenveen) is a sailor from the Netherlands and Olympic coach. He represented the Netherlands three times at the Olympic Games and is a multiple National, European and World Champion.

Postma starts sailing in an Optimist when he is seven years old. He graduated as a Maritime Officer and Technical Business Administration before participating in the 2008 Olympic Games in Beijing. During these games, Pieter-Jan Postma is 26 and takes fourteenth place. During the Olympic Games in London he reached the fourth place. He also participates in the Olympic Games in Rio de Janeiro and reaches the tenth place.

He is a member of the Royal Water Sports Association Sneek.

Personal life
Postma spent the first seventeen years of his life in Terkaple, a tiny village in Friesland. He has a sister who is four years older and a sister who is two years younger. As a child, he spent a lot of time playing different sports: football, tennis, speed skating, and sailing. After secondary school, Postma started a study for Naval Officer on Terschelling in 2000, which he completed in 2005. From then on Postma focuses entirely on his sailing career. In 2010 he takes a break from sailing and completes his studies in Industrial Engineering and Management in Leeuwarden. Postma currently lives in Friesland.

Sailing career

Early sailing career 
At the age of thirteen, Postma participates in his first European Championship Optimist and at the age of fifteen he sailed at the World Championship in Dublin. In 1998, at the age of sixteen, Postma switched to the Laser and, just like in 1999 and 2000, again sails at the World Cup. In 2000 he participates in the ISAF World Championship in Sydney. He reaches 10th place. After returning from his internship at sea, Postma started preparing for the 2004 Olympic Games in Athens. Postma wins the national selection, but misses the Olympic qualification. In 2004 he became Dutch Laser champion for the first time.

Adult sailing career 
In 2005 he made the switch to the Finn class. In this phase of his sailing career, Postma is in search how to fully utilize his potential and is on the look for the right rhythm and suitable partners. This quest provides him with a strong foundation to enter the big competitions that are upcoming in these days. He qualified three times for the Olympic Games (2008, 2012 and 2016) and achieved good results during the Pre-Olympics: he won silver twice (2007 and 2015) and bronze once (2011). This makes Postma a favorite for the stage. However, Postma did not manage to gain a medal; in 2016 he lost his golden medal at the last buoy and eventually finished fourth. He also returns home without a medal at the other Olympic Games.

Postma does win many titles at World Cups, European Championships, National Championships and World Cups. In 2000, 2007 and 2011 he won silver at the World Cup, in 2013, 2016, 2018 and 2019 bronze at the World Cup. In 2022 he won gold twice at the World Cup and at the European Championship in 2016 he won the gold medal. In addition, Postma became Dutch Champion eleven times and won a World Cup six times. 

Postma's sailing career is characterized by continuous development and innovation. This ultimately brings him the gold medal at the 2022 World Cup. It also gives him a strong foundation for being a coach after his sailing career in the Finn class.

Coaching 
Since 2019, Postma has been working as a coach in the sailing world. In 2020 and 2021 he was coach of the Dutch Sail team that sails in the 69F. With the 69F, the team led by Postma wins the Gold Cup in 2020 and 2021. Next to these medals the team wins eight other events. In 2019 he coached the Hungarian Zsombor Berecz, who qualified for the Olympic Games (Finn class) under the leadership of Postma and won bronze at the World Cup. Postma also coached the Turkish yacht racer Alican Kaynar who wins the Olympic Games (Finn class).

Sailing projects 
In 2016, Postma founded Sailing Team NL with the aim of stimulating more cooperation in the Dutch sailing world. He uses his experiences as a professional sailor. As part of this project, he purchased two M32s in 2017 and competed worldwide with a match-race team. In 2018, as race director and manager, he organized several events around this project, many of which where located in Valencia. With the M32 the European series where won in 2018, in 2019 the round of Texel was won.

In 2020, Postma continues these collaborative projects. He invites Sailing Holland, Dutch Sail and the water sports association to work together on Youth America's Cup. This project is growing into a project in which the 69F is sailed.

References

 LinkedIn
 Facebook

Living people
1982 births
Sportspeople from Heerenveen
Dutch male sailors (sport)
Sailors at the 2008 Summer Olympics – Finn
Sailors at the 2012 Summer Olympics – Finn
Olympic sailors of the Netherlands
Laser Radial class sailors
Laser class sailors
Sailors at the 2016 Summer Olympics – Finn